Olivia Maria Lustosa Byington (born December 24, 1958) is a Brazilian singer.

Career
Olívia started her career as a vocalist at the end of the 1970s, with the rock band Antena Coletiva, and with Jacques Morelembaum. She was quickly considered by the critic Sérgio Cabral as the "best singer of her generation". Her first record, "Corra o Risco", was recorded in 1978 with "Barca do Sol." The following year Olívia reached the top of the hit parade with the song "Lady Jane".

Her third album, recorded in Cuba on the invitation of Silvio Rodríguez, broadened her horizons internationally. In 1994 Olívia arrived in Lisbon, where she performed many concerts at the Maria Matos Theater, and captivated an audience as yet unfamiliar with her work with her wide vocal range and singing.

The public and critics responded with such surprise that the following year Olívia went to Belém to perform in the great hall at the city's cultural center. She returned to Portugal for Expo 98 in Évora, Monsaraz, and Aveiro. Recently she performed at Lisbon's Aula Magna, and at Porto's Coliseu with the great Egberto Gismonti. As a matter of fact, Olívia has always been in the company of great names, such as Tom Jobim, Chico Buarque, Edu Lobo, Djavan, Wagner Tiso, Radamés Gnatali, and João Carlos de Assis Brasil.

In her career, Olívia has released several albums: Anjo vadio (1980), Identidad (1981), Para Viver um Grande Amor (1983), Música (1984), Encontro (1984) (Chiquinha Gonzaga Award), Melodia Sentimental (1986), Olivia Byington and João Carlos Assis Brasil (1990) and A Dama do Encantado (1997), the former in tribute to Aracy de Almeida. In 2003, she released Canção do Amor Demais, in which she re-recorded an anthological album first recorded in 1958 by Elizeth Cardoso, featuring songs by Tom Jobim and Vinicius de Moraes.

In 2005, a meeting with the Portuguese poet Tiago Torres da Silva in Rio de Janeiro drove Olívia back to songwriting, which she missed greatly. Having played the guitar from the age of eight, Olívia easily picked up the lyrics of "Areias do Leblon," and brought to the song all the sensuality and music of the beaches of Rio de Janeiro. After this song, others followed, many with the lyrics written by the Portuguese writer, but also songs written by other poets, such as Geraldo Carneiro, Cacaso, and Marcelo Pires.

Songs such as these, so characteristic of her nature, have created the most confessional album of her career, a record in which Olívia not only assumes the role of a great singer, one that the critics and the public are following attentively in Brazil, but as a great song writer, able to create harmonically rich songs, with exceptionally original melodies.

The work being intimate, Byington surrounded herself with friends. She invited Leandro Braga to do part of the musical arrangement, and also the Portuguese Pedro Jóia, who played with her in "Clarão" and "Balada do Avesso", and many other great musicians like Marco Pereira, João Lyra, Zero and Zé Canuto.

She also wanted to share the singing, so she shared the microphone with Seu Jorge in "Na Ponta dos Pés," and with the great singer Maria Bethânia in "Mãe Quelé," a homage to Clementina de Jesus, a deceased Afro-Brazilian singer.
Olivia Byington the record has the same characteristics as "Olivia Byington" the singer. The extraordinary sophistication of both record and artist makes these songs originally popular and delightfully erudite.

References

1958 births
Living people
Musicians from Rio de Janeiro (city)
Brazilian people of American descent
20th-century Brazilian women singers
20th-century Brazilian singers
21st-century Brazilian women singers
21st-century Brazilian singers